Neubukow-Salzhaff is an Amt in the district of Rostock, in Mecklenburg-Vorpommern, Germany. The seat of the Amt is in Neubukow, itself not part of the Amt.

The Amt Neubukow-Salzhaff consists of the following municipalities:
 Alt Bukow
 Am Salzhaff
 Bastorf
 Biendorf
 Carinerland
 Rerik

References

Ämter in Mecklenburg-Western Pomerania
Rostock (district)